Jaan Philip Tear (born 16 August 1998) is a Swedish footballer who plays as a goalkeeper for Portuguese club Tondela.

Career

Tear started his career with Swedish sixth tier side FC Djursholm. In 2016, he signed for Rayo Cantabria in the Spanish fourth tier. In 2021, Tear signed for Portuguese top flight club Tondela.

References

External links

  

1998 births
Living people
Swedish footballers
Association football goalkeepers
Rayo Cantabria players
CD Tenerife B players
Club Portugalete players
C.D. Tondela players
Tercera División players
Primeira Liga players
Swedish expatriate footballers
Expatriate footballers in Spain
Swedish expatriate sportspeople in Spain
Expatriate footballers in Portugal
Swedish expatriate sportspeople in Portugal